Edmond de la Fontaine (24 July 1823 – 24 June 1891), better known by his pen name of Dicks, was a Luxembourgian jurist, poet, and lyricist, known for his work in the Luxembourgish language.  He is considered the national poet of Luxembourg, and along with Michel Lentz and Michel Rodange, one of the most important figures in the history of Luxembourgian literature.  In addition, his Luxemburger Sitten und Bräuche was one of the most influential early ethnographies on the Luxembourgian people.

Fontaine was the third son of Gaspard-Théodore-Ignace de la Fontaine, who was appointed Governor of Luxembourg in 1841, and subsequently served as the country's first Prime Minister in 1848. Fontaine studied law at Liège, and spent a further year at Heidelberg pursuing Germanic studies from 1844 until 1847, before becoming a lawyer in 1850. From 1867 until 1870, he served as mayor of Stadtbredimus, in eastern Luxembourg's Moselle Valley, and served as a Justice of the Peace in Vianden from 1881 and 1889. He lived in Stadtbredimus Castle from 1858 to 1881 where he would live for the last decade of his life.

Works

Lyrics
 Liss, du bass mäi Caprice
 Den Hexemeeschter

Poetry
 D’Vulleparlament am Grengewald 1848

Plays
 De Wëllefchen a de Fiischen
 D'Vulleparlament am Gréngewald
 Am Wanter
 Komeidisteck

Ethnography
 Luxemburger Sitten und Bräuche, Luxemburg: Brück 1883 (in German)
 Die luxemburger Kinderreime, Luxemburg: Bück 1877

Legacy
The Dicks-Lentz Monument at the west end of Place d'Armes in Luxembourg City was built in 1903 to honor Dicks and Michel Lentz.

External links

References

1823 births
1891 deaths
Luxembourgian poets
19th-century Luxembourgian lawyers
People from Luxembourg City
Alumni of the Athénée de Luxembourg
19th-century poets
19th-century Luxembourgian writers